Yvan Neyou Noupa (born 3 January 1997) is a Cameroonian professional footballer who plays as a midfielder for Segunda División club Leganés, on loan from  club Saint-Étienne, and the Cameroon national team.

Club career

Sedan and Laval
Neyou started his career with Sedan in the Championnat National, where good performances had him linked with Belgian side Standard Liège and French champions Paris Saint-Germain. However, he ultimately joined Ligue 2 side Laval in early 2017. He made his debut against Red Star on 10 February 2017, coming on as a substitute for Romain Bayard.

Braga B
Neyou also enjoyed a stint with Braga B, during which the team was relegated from the LigaPro to the Campeonato de Portugal.

Saint-Étienne
On 10 July 2020, Neyou joined Ligue 1 club Saint-Étienne on a one-year loan with an option to buy. He made his first appearance with the club as a substitute in the 2020 Coupe de France final against Paris Saint-Germain, which ended in a 1–0 victory for the Parisian club.

After putting up some good performances, Neyou earned himself a permanent deal with Saint-Étienne on 18 November 2020. He signed a contract lasting until 2024.

Loan to Leganés
On 31 August 2022, Neyou moved to Spanish Segunda División side Leganés on a one-year loan deal.

International career
Neyou debuted with the senior Cameroon national team in a 1–0 friendly win over Nigeria on 4 June 2021.

Career statistics

Honours 
Saint-Étienne
 Coupe de France runner-up: 2019–20

Cameroon

 Africa Cup of Nations third place: 2021

References

External links
 
 
 

Living people
1997 births
Footballers from Douala
Association football midfielders
Cameroonian footballers
Cameroon international footballers
Championnat National players
Ligue 2 players
Championnat National 3 players
Liga Portugal 2 players
Campeonato de Portugal (league) players
Ligue 1 players
CS Sedan Ardennes players
Stade Lavallois players
S.C. Braga B players
AS Saint-Étienne players
CD Leganés players
Cameroonian expatriate footballers
Expatriate footballers in France
Cameroonian expatriate sportspeople in France
Expatriate footballers in Portugal
Cameroonian expatriate sportspeople in Portugal
Expatriate footballers in Spain
Cameroonian expatriate sportspeople in Spain
2021 Africa Cup of Nations players